Donglizhuang is a town under the administration of Jinzhou City in south-central Hebei province, China, located  south-southeast of the municipal seat. , it has 27 villages under its administration.

See also
List of township-level divisions of Hebei

References

Township-level divisions of Hebei